James Henry may refer to:

In government and military
James Henry (Continental Congress) (1731–1804), American lawyer, Continental Congressman for Virginia
James Buchanan Henry (1833–1915), lawyer, writer, secretary to the President, nephew and ward of James Buchanan
James D. Henry (1797–1834), American militia officer
James Henry (judge) (born 1962), justice of the Supreme Court of Queensland
James Henry (soldier) (1833–1911), Union Army soldier and Medal of Honor recipient
James R. Henry (politician) (born 1963), member of the Massachusetts House of Representatives

In sport
James Henry (footballer) (born 1989), English footballer for Oxford United F.C.
James R. Henry (American football), American college football player and coach
James Henry (ice hockey), American ice hockey player and coach

Other people
James Henry (poet) (1798–1876), Irish poet and scholar
James Henry (writer), British comedy writer
James Dupree Henry (1950–1984), American criminal executed in Florida
James S. Henry, American economist, attorney, and investigative journalist
James Pepper Henry, American museum director

See also
Jim Henry (disambiguation)

Henry James (disambiguation)